Bolshoye Oksilovo is a rural locality (a village) in Vakhnevskoye Rural Settlement, Nikolsky District, Vologda Oblast, Russia. The population was 57 as of 2002.

Geography 
Bolshoye Oksilovo is located 38 km northwest of Nikolsk (the district's administrative centre) by road. Podgorye is the nearest rural locality.

References 

Rural localities in Nikolsky District, Vologda Oblast